K.A.O.S. On the Road was a concert tour performed by Roger Waters in 1987 in support of the album Radio K.A.O.S. (1987). The shows included material from the album as well as songs from well known Pink Floyd albums such as The Dark Side of the Moon (1973), Wish You Were Here (1975) and The Wall (1979). The tour started in North America on 14 August 1987 and ended on 22 November 1987 with two performances at Wembley Arena in London, England.

The show included designs by Mark Fisher such as circular screens, quadrophonic sounds, back projections and in some cases introductions to the show by radio DJ Jim Ladd. A telephone booth allowed the audience to direct questions at Waters.

Performers and presentation 
Unlike The Pros and Cons of Hitch Hiking tour in 1984, the Radio K.A.O.S. tour established The Bleeding Heart Band. A number of these musicians would continue to play or be involved with Roger Waters over the next 20 years. Both Doreen Chanter and Katie Kissoon had performed on the 1984 tour.

Also unlike Waters's previous solo tours (or his last several tours with Pink Floyd), the Radio K.A.O.S. concept and storyline was presented with fan-favourite Pink Floyd material integrated into the set list, rather than dividing the show in two, with the new album played in its entirety and in its precise running order. "Going to Live in L.A.", a b-side to the single "Radio Waves", was also performed, as well as live exclusive "Molly's Song", which was also released as a b-side to the single "Who Needs Information" after the tour.

Some of Waters's "old Pink Floyd stuff" was significantly revamped, with the female backing vocalists taking a more prominent role, Paul Carrack singing David Gilmour's parts in a "blue-eyed soul" style, funk-style bass playing from Andy Fairweather-Low, and saxophone solos added to songs like "Welcome to the Machine".

With a few exceptions, the Pink Floyd songs Waters chose for his set list were those written by him alone, rather than material like "Comfortably Numb", or other songs co-written with David Gilmour or Rick Wright. However, in response to requests from fans using the telephone booth, he promised to include "Comfortably Numb" in future tours.

Tour band 

The band featured:

 Roger Waters – vocals, bass guitar and acoustic guitar
 Andy Fairweather-Low – rhythm guitar, bass guitar and backing vocals
 Jay Stapley – lead guitar and backing vocals
 Paul Carrack – keyboards and vocals
 Graham Broad – drums and percussion
 Mel Collins – saxophone
 Doreen Chanter – backing vocals
 Katie Kissoon – backing vocals
 Clare Torry – lead vocals on "The Great Gig in the Sky" on 26 August at Madison Square Garden and on 21 and 22 November at Wembley Arena

Setlist 
First set
"Tempted" (Paul Carrack solo performance)
"Radio Waves"
"Welcome to the Machine"
"Who Needs Information"
"Money"
"In the Flesh"
"Have a Cigar"
"Pigs (Three Different Ones)"
"Wish You Were Here"
"Mother"
"Molly's Song"
"Me or Him"
"The Powers That Be"
Second set
"Going to Live in L.A."
"Sunset Strip"
"5:01 AM (The Pros and Cons of Hitch Hiking)" (dropped after 6 September)
"Get Your Filthy Hands Off My Desert" (added from September 8 onward)
"Southampton Dock" (added from September 8 onward)
"Arnold Layne" (video "played" by Billy for the audience)
"If"
"5:06 AM (Every Strangers Eyes)"
"Not Now John"
"Another Brick in the Wall, Part 1"
"The Happiest Days of Our Lives"
"Another Brick in the Wall, Part 2"
"Nobody Home"
"Home"
"Four Minutes"
"The Tide Is Turning"
Encore
"Breathe"
"The Great Gig in the Sky" (performed at both Wembley Arena shows and at Madison Square Garden, New York)
"Brain Damage"
"Eclipse"
"Outside the Wall" (performed at The Forum, Inglewood, California)

Note – "In the Flesh", "Have a Cigar", "Pigs (Three Different Ones)" and "Wish You Were Here" were performed as a medley.

Tour dates

References

External links 
Radio K.A.O.S. Tour Book

Roger Waters concert tours
1987 concert tours